The William L. Terry House is a historic house at 1422 Scott Street in Little Rock, Arkansas.  It is a roughly L-shaped 2-1/2 wood-frame structure, its appearance somewhat irregular due to the presence of projecting elements.  Its porch extends across part of the front, and then the inside of the L, with bracketed square posts and a spindled balustrade.  Built in the 1880s, it is a particularly elegant and restrained example of Queen Anne architecture.

The house was listed on the National Register of Historic Places in 1976.

See also
National Register of Historic Places listings in Little Rock, Arkansas

References

Houses on the National Register of Historic Places in Arkansas
Queen Anne architecture in Arkansas
Houses completed in 1878
Houses in Little Rock, Arkansas
National Register of Historic Places in Little Rock, Arkansas
Historic district contributing properties in Arkansas